Argo Meresaar (born 13 January 1980 in Pärnu) is a former Estonian volleyball player who is currently the assistant coach of Bigbank Tartu.

Career
He was a member of the Estonian national team from 2000 to 2013. Meresaar started his career in hometown club ESS Falck Pärnu. During his career, Meresaar has also played in Estonian teams Pere Leib Tartu and Selver Tallinn. He has spent one season in Russia playing for Neftyanik Yaroslavl. He represented Estonia at the 2009 and 2011 European Volleyball Championships. To date he is one of the most experienced players for the national team with 175 games to his name. Meresaar has been voted Estonian Volleyball Player of the Year five times (2000–2003 and 2009).

Sporting achievements

Clubs
Baltic League
  2005/2006 – with Pere Leib Tartu
  2008/2009 – with Selver Tallinn
  2009/2010 – with Selver Tallinn
  2010/2011 – with Selver Tallinn
  2011/2012 – with Selver Tallinn
  2013/2014 – with Bigbank Tartu
  2014/2015 – with Bigbank Tartu

National championship
 1996/1997  Estonian Championship, with Pärnu
 1998/1999  Estonian Championship, with ESS Pärnu
 1999/2000  Estonian Championship, with ESS Pärnu
 2000/2001  Estonian Championship, with ESS Pärnu
 2001/2002  Estonian Championship, with ESS Pärnu
 2002/2003  Estonian Championship, with ESS Pärnu
 2003/2004  Estonian Championship, with ESS Falck Pärnu
 2005/2006  Estonian Championship, with Pere Leib Tartu
 2006/2007  Estonian Championship, with Pere Leib Tartu
 2007/2008  Estonian Championship, with Pärnu
 2008/2009  Estonian Championship, with Selver Tallinn
 2009/2010  Estonian Championship, with Selver Tallinn
 2010/2011  Estonian Championship, with Selver Tallinn
 2011/2012  Estonian Championship, with Selver Tallinn
 2012/2013  Estonian Championship, with Selver Tallinn
 2013/2014  Estonian Championship, with Bigbank Tartu
 2014/2015  Estonian Championship, with Bigbank Tartu

National cup
 1998/1999  Estonian Cup 1998, with ESS Pärnu
 1999/2000  Estonian Cup 1999, with ESS Pärnu
 2000/2001  Estonian Cup 2000, with ESS Pärnu
 2001/2002  Estonian Cup 2001, with ESS Pärnu
 2002/2003  Estonian Cup 2002, with ESS Pärnu
 2003/2004  Estonian Cup 2003, with ESS Falck Pärnu
 2005/2006  Estonian Cup 2004, with Pere Leib Tartu
 2006/2007  Estonian Cup 2006, with Pere Leib Tartu
 2008/2009  Estonian Cup 2008, with Selver Tallinn
 2009/2010  Estonian Cup 2009, with Selver Tallinn
 2010/2011  Estonian Cup 2010, with Selver Tallinn
 2011/2012  Estonian Cup 2011, with Selver Tallinn
 2012/2013  Estonian Cup 2012, with Selver Tallinn
 2013/2014  Estonian Cup 2013, with Bigbank Tartu

Individual
 2000 Estonian Volleyball Player of the Year
 2001 Estonian Volleyball Player of the Year
 2002 Estonian Volleyball Player of the Year
 2003 Estonian Volleyball Player of the Year
 2009 Estonian Volleyball Player of the Year
 2010 Baltic League – Best Opposite Hitter

References

External links
 Player profile on the FIVB official site

1980 births
Living people
Sportspeople from Pärnu
Estonian men's volleyball players
Estonian expatriate volleyball players
Estonian expatriate sportspeople in Russia
Expatriate volleyball players in Russia
Estonian volleyball coaches